Charleston is a 1977 Italian comedy film written and directed by Marcello Fondato. It reprises the style of the film The Sting (1973). It was distributed in the United States by Analysis Film Releasing Corporation.

Plot summary 
Joe Lo Monaco is an owner of a steamship which has a large casino. A band of evildoers exploits him for his earnings about gambling on roulette, so Lo Monaco really wants to destroy the ship, but he realizes the ship is insured and that destroying it would lose a lot of money. In London meanwhile, the trickster Charleston is arrested for being found with a false identity. However, he manages to escape from prison as soon as he is offered the job of helping Lo Monaco from evildoers ...

Cast 
 Bud Spencer: Charleston
 James Coco: Joe Lo Monaco
 Herbert Lom: Inspector Watkins
 Jack La Cayenne: Jack Watson / Columbus
 Dino Emanuelli: Bull
 Ronald Lacey: Frankie
 Geoffrey Bayldon: Fred
 Renzo Marignano: Morris
 Lucretia Love: Secretary

References

External links
 

1977 films
1970s crime comedy films
1970s heist films
Italian comedy films
Italian heist films
English-language Italian films
1970s English-language films
1970s Italian-language films
Films scored by Guido & Maurizio De Angelis
Italian crime comedy films
Films about con artists
Films set in London
Films about gambling
1977 comedy films
1977 multilingual films
Italian multilingual films
1970s Italian films